Morris Ogenga Latigo is a Ugandan professor of agriculture, Academic and politician of the Forum for Democratic Change (FDC) who was the leader of opposition  in the Ugandan Parliament from 2006 to 2010.

Life and political career 
Latigo hails from Northern Uganda. He was elected to the parliament representing the Agago North constituency on the ticket of FDC. From 2006 to 2010, he served as the leader of the opposition in parliament. He left the FDC in 2020 after failing to secure the party's ticket to run for re-election to Agago North constituency seat in the parliament describing the FDC and all other political parties in Unganda as “stinking”. He then declared that he would run for the Agago North Parliamentary seat as an independent candidate.

In January 2019, Latigo was involved in an auto crash while travelling to his home town in Northern Uganda when his vehicle collided with an on-coming bus but survived the crash. This was the fourth time he was involved in motor accident. In October 2009, and in January 2011, Latigo survived fatal accidents along Kampala-Gulu highway. On January 30, 2018, his vehicle rammed into a parked truck in Kakooge, Luwero district along Kampala highway.

References 

Forum for Democratic Change politicians
Ugandan academics